Estella (Spanish) or Lizarra (Basque) is a town located in the autonomous community of Navarre, in northern Spain. It lies south west of Pamplona, close to the border with La Rioja and Álava.

The town was founded in 1090 when the place, lying by the fortified settlement of Lizarra, was granted a charter by the Pamplonese king Sancho Ramirez. The town became a landmark in the Way of St. James pilgrimage route to Santiago de Compostela, thriving on the privileged location and the melting pot of Francos called in by Navarrese kings (mainly Occitans from Auvergne and Limousin), Jews and the original Navarrese inhabitants. The wealth resulted in a development of Romanesque architecture, well represented in the town: Church of San Pedro de la Rúa, Palacio de los Reyes de Navarra, Church of San Miguel, among others.

The town was long the headquarters of Don Carlos, who was proclaimed king here in 1833. It was a major headquarters of the Carlist party in the Carlist Wars of the mid 19th century, with Tomás de Zumalacárregui being appointed Commander in Chief in this Estella-Lizarra. On 16 February 1876 the Carlists in the town surrendered.

Between 1927 and 1967, the town held the terminus of the iconic Ferrocarril Vasco-Navarro railway extending up to Bergara. The line was fitted with electrified power supply as of 1938, a provision considered a feat at the time.

In 1927, Club Deportivo Izarra was formed who currently play in the Segunda División B.
    
The town regularly hosts the GP Miguel Induráin.

Notable residents
Aaron ben Zerah – Jewish martyr of the 14th century.
Javi Martínez – professional footballer for Bayern Munich and Spain, with whom he won the World Cup.

References

External links

Ayuntamiento de Estella – Lizarra
 Estella.- Medieval History of Navarre
 Estella – Lizarra in the Bernardo Estornés Lasa – Auñamendi Encyclopedia (Euskomedia Fundazioa) 
 Estella-Lizarra Info. Official Website of Tourism in Spain

Municipalities in Navarre